Barbara Jagiellon (15 July 1478 – 15 February 1534) was a Polish princess, member of the Jagiellonian dynasty and by marriage Duchess of Saxony.

Born in Sandomierz, she was the sixth daughter of King Casimir IV of Poland and Archduchess Elisabeth of Austria. She was named after her great-grandmother, Barbara of Cilli, Holy Roman Empress.

Life 
Barbara was married on 21 November 1496 in a glittering ceremony in Leipzig to George, Duke of Saxony (1471–1539). At the wedding, 6,286 German and Polish nobles were said to be present. This marriage was a key part of maintaining good diplomatic relations between Germany and Poland. For Barbara's family, the marriage was also important due to their rivalry with the House of Habsburg.

In 1513, Barbara and her husband founded Meissen Cathedral; several Masses and liturgical celebration of Easter have been recorded to have taken place since then. Barbara sent letters to her husband while he was at battles. Witnesses say the couple had a very loving and happy marriage.

Barbara died in Leipzig aged 55. Her husband was so stricken by grief that he grew a beard during this time, which was why he was nicknamed "the Bearded". She was buried in the cathedral of Meissen in her husband's funeral chapel, built between 1521-1524. Barbara and George were the last Prince and Princess of the House of Wettin to be buried at the cathedral. The altarpiece in the funerary chapel was the work of Lucas Cranach the Elder. They are surrounded by apostles and saints.

Issue

 Christoph of Saxony (8 September 1497 – 5 December 1497).
 Johann of Saxony (24 August 1498 – 11 January 1537); married on 20 May 1516 to Elisabeth of Hesse. This union was childless.
 Wolfgang of Saxony (1499 – 12 January 1500).
 Anna of Saxony (21 January 1500 – 23 January 1500).
 Christoph of Saxony (born and died 27 May 1501).
 Agnes of Saxony (7 January 1503 – 16 April 1503).
 Frederick of Saxony (15 March 1504 – 26 February 1539); married on 27 January 1539 to Elisabeth of Mansfeld. This union was childless.
 Christine of Saxony (25 December 1505 – 15 April 1549); married on 11 December 1523 to Philip I, Landgrave of Hesse.
 Magdalena of Saxony (7 March 1507 – 25 January 1534); married on 6 November 1524 to Joachim Hector, then Electoral Prince of Brandenburg.
 Margarethe of Saxony (7 September 1508 – d. Dresden, 19 December 1510).

Ancestry

References

Bibliography
Z. Wdowiszewski: Genealogia Jagiellonów i Domu Wazów w Polsce, Avalon, Kraków 2005, pp. 131–132 and genealogical table in p. 210.

 

 

Jagiellonian dynasty
House of Wettin
1478 births
1534 deaths
Polish princesses
Duchesses of Saxony
Margravines of Meissen
⚭Barbara Jagiellon
Daughters of kings